KHG may refer to:

 Khams Tibetan (ISO 639 language code: khg) a Tibetic language used in Kham
 Kashgar Airport (IATA airport code: KHG; ICAO airport code: ZWSH) Kashi, Xinjiang, China
 Khushal Garh railway station (rail code: KHG) in Pakistan
 Kommunistische Hochschulgruppe (KHG; University Communist Society; literally Communist High School Group), a division of the Communist League of West Germany

See also